Raniganj is a constituency of the Uttar Pradesh Legislative Assembly covering the city of Raniganj in the Pratapgarh district of Uttar Pradesh, India.

Raniganj is one of five assembly constituencies in the Pratapgarh Lok Sabha constituency. Since 2008, this assembly constituency is numbered 250 amongst 403 constituencies.
Dr RK Verma from Samajwadi Party is current MLA.

Election results

2022

2017
Bharatiya Janta Party's Dhiraj Ojha won in last Assembly election of 2017 Uttar Pradesh Legislative Elections defeating Bahujan Samaj Party candidate Shakeel Ahmad Khan by a margin of 9,009 votes.

References

External links
 

Assembly constituencies of Uttar Pradesh
Pratapgarh district, Uttar Pradesh